Larrys Mabiala Destin (born 8 October 1987) is a professional footballer who plays for the Portland Timbers, having previously played for Turkish Süper Lig club Kayserispor as a defender, Paris Saint-Germain, Plymouth Argyle, and Nice. Born in France, he has previously represented the DR Congo national team.

Club career
Mabiala began playing football at a young age, representing Nogent-on-Oise and Chantilly, before joining Paris Saint-Germain at the age of 14. He signed his first professional contract in November 2006 and made two appearances during the 2006–07 season, in the Coupe de la Ligue and UEFA Cup. A France under-21 international, Mabiala joined English club Plymouth Argyle on a season-long loan in August 2007. A long-term knee injury blighted his time with the club, forcing him to return to Paris for treatment, and the loan was eventually cancelled. Mabiala returned to Paris Saint-Germain in January 2008 and went on to make three appearances in Ligue 1, scoring once.

He was transferred to fellow Ligue 1 side Nice in June 2009 for an undisclosed fee and signed a four-year contract. Two and a half years later, Mabiala left Nice to join Turkish club Karabükspor for an undisclosed fee, having agreed a contract with the Süper Lig side until the summer of 2014.

Mabiala signed a two-year contract with Kayserispor on 7 August 2015.

On 29 May 2017, a team source confirmed that the Portland Timbers signed Mabiala. He scored the opening goal in the MLS is Back Tournament Final.

International career
Having represented France at youth international level, Mabiala received his first call-up to represent Congo DR in 2008. He made his senior international debut in a 1–1 draw with Algeria in Nanterre.

Honours
Coupe de la Ligue: 2007–08
MLS is Back Tournament: 2020

References

External links

1987 births
Living people
People from Montfermeil
Footballers from Seine-Saint-Denis
French footballers
France under-21 international footballers
Democratic Republic of the Congo footballers
Democratic Republic of the Congo international footballers
Democratic Republic of the Congo expatriate footballers
Association football defenders
Paris Saint-Germain F.C. players
Plymouth Argyle F.C. players
OGC Nice players
Kardemir Karabükspor footballers
Kayserispor footballers
Portland Timbers players
Ligue 1 players
Süper Lig players
Major League Soccer players
Expatriate footballers in Turkey
Expatriate soccer players in the United States
2013 Africa Cup of Nations players

French sportspeople of Democratic Republic of the Congo descent
Black French sportspeople